Vicente dos Santos (born 10 June 1929) is a Brazilian boxer. He competed in the men's heavyweight event at the 1948 Summer Olympics. At the 1948 Summer Olympics, he lost to Jay Lambert of the United States.

References

External links
 

1929 births
Possibly living people
Brazilian male boxers
Olympic boxers of Brazil
Boxers at the 1948 Summer Olympics
Sportspeople from São Paulo
Heavyweight boxers